The Church of St Peter and St Paul, the co-cathedral of the Roman Catholic Archdiocese of Đakovo-Osijek, is a neo-Gothic sacral structure located in Osijek, Croatia. The multi-tiered 90-metre spire is one of the city's landmarks. The church was built in 1898 on the initiative of the Bishop of Đakovo Josip Juraj Strossmayer.

The church is entered via a small door to the right of the main portal, overlooked by a trio of gargoyles. The interior is a treasure trove of neo-Gothic ornamentation, with a succession of pinnacled altars overlooked by exuberant stained glass windows. The interior was finished off in 1938–1942 when leading Croatian painter Mirko Rački covered the walls and ceilings with brightly coloured frescoes illustrating famous episodes from the Old and New Testaments.

Masses are held daily at 07:00 and 18:30, and on Sundays at 06:30, 07:30, 08:30, 10:00, 11:30 and 18:30.

Trivia 
 This is the tallest building in Croatia outside of Zagreb.
 Capacity of the church during the mass is over 3000 people.
 The church is built of three and a half million bricks, and has a colored stone altars.
 The four tower bells weigh 2665 kg, 1552 kg, 740 kg. and 331 kg.
 In 1991, during Croatian War of Independence the church was heavily damaged.

References

External links 

Roman Catholic churches completed in 1898
19th-century Roman Catholic church buildings in Croatia
Buildings and structures in Osijek
1898 establishments in Austria-Hungary
Roman Catholic cathedrals in Croatia
Tourist attractions in Osijek-Baranja County
Culture in Osijek
Co-cathedral